The 2019 Johan Cruyff Shield was the 24th edition of the Johan Cruyff Shield, an annual Dutch football match played between the winners of the previous season's Eredivisie and KNVB Cup. The match was contested by Ajax, as both the 2018–19 Eredivisie champion and the 2018–19 KNVB Cup winners, and PSV Eindhoven as runners-up of the Eredivisie. The match was held on 27 July 2019 at the home of the Eredivisie champions Ajax, the Johan Cruyff Arena in Amsterdam.

Ajax won the match 2–0 for their ninth Johan Cruyff Shield.

Match

Details

See also
2018–19 Eredivisie
2018–19 KNVB Cup
AFC Ajax–PSV Eindhoven rivalry

References

2019
AFC Ajax matches
PSV Eindhoven matches
2019–20 in Dutch football
July 2019 sports events in the Netherlands